The Silver Jubilee of George V on 6 May 1935 marked 25 years of George V as the King of the United Kingdom and the British Dominions, and Emperor of India. The Jubilee was marked with large-scale and popular events throughout London and the rest of the United Kingdom in May 1935. It was the first ever Silver Jubilee celebration of any British monarch in history. The King died less than a year later.

Celebrations

The Silver Jubilee Celebrations in London began with a carriage procession through London to St Paul's Cathedral for a national service of thanksgiving on 6 May 1935. It was followed by another procession back to Buckingham Palace, where the Royal Family appeared on the balcony. The King and Queen were joined by members of the Royal Family, including Queen Maud of Norway, the Prince of Wales, the Duke and Duchess of York, Princess Mary and the Earl of Harewood, the Duke of Gloucester, and the Duke and Duchess of Kent. Due to popular demand, the King waved from the same balcony for a few consecutive days later in the same week.

The Jubilee day was declared a bank holiday and celebrations were held across the United Kingdom with garden parties, pageants and sports events. At 8 pm, the King's Jubilee speech was broadcast. He gave thanks "from the depths of his heart to his dear people" on behalf of himself and Queen Mary, for the Jubilee commemorations.

Throughout the month of May, the King continued taking carriage rides through London. He also took one through north London for the Queen's birthday on 26 May, during which they were accompanied by their two granddaughters: Princesses Elizabeth and Margaret of York.

The Jubilee was also marked with a ball for two thousand guests at Buckingham Palace on 14 May, an Empire Exhibition and the State Opening of Parliament. A reception was hosted by the Lord Mayor of London in honour of the King and Queen, which was also attended by the Prince of Wales and the Duke and Duchess of York.

During the Jubilee celebrations, the King received a large number of telegrams from across the empire and around the world, with warm wishes, both from world leaders and his subjects. The public's reaction to George V's appearances over the jubilant celebrations only confirmed the popularity of a Jubilee celebration as well as the esteem in which the King was held.

Other commemorations

A Silver Jubilee Medal was created to a commemorate the Jubilee. It was awarded to the members of the Royal Family and selected officers of state, officials and servants of the Royal Household, ministers, government officials, mayors, public servants, local government officials, members of the navy, army, air force and police in Britain, her colonies and Dominions.

The Jubilee was marked by loads of different Jubilee souvenirs. Every child born on the Jubilee Day (6 May 1935) was given a special silver commemorative cup. A Silver crown coin was also released by the Royal Mint to mark the Jubilee. Specific sets of stamps were issued for the Jubilee in the United Kingdom and the dominions, including issues in Australia, Canada, India, New Zealand and South Africa.

The Bank of Canada issued its first commemorative banknote to commemorate the King's Silver Jubilee. It was a $25 banknote in the 1935 Series. The royal purple banknote was issued on 6 May 1935, and is the only $25 banknote ever issued by the Bank of Canada.

A mountain in Strathcona Provincial Park on Vancouver Island in British Columbia, Canada was named Mount George V after George V, to commemorate his Silver jubilee in 1935.

In Sungai Petani, Malaysia, a 12.1 m clock tower was built on the main street, Jalan Ibrahim, in 1936. The tower, topped by a dome-shaped structure, was a present from Lim Lean Teng to King George V and Queen Mary to commemorate the Silver Jubilee.

The Jubilee Pool, an open-air seaside lido, was opened in Penzance, Cornwall to commemorate the Jubilee.

For the 1935 Silver Jubilee, the first version of Jubilee chicken was created, and was based on chicken dressed with mayonnaise and curry powder.

Gallery

See also 
 1935 Birthday Honours
 1935 Birthday Honours (New Zealand)
 Special address by the British monarch
 List of monarchs in Britain by length of reign
 List of jubilees of British monarchs

References

External links 
 Sound recording of King George V's Silver Jubilee speech

 
1935 in the United Kingdom
George V
British royal jubilees
1935 in Canada
Monarchy in Canada
1935 in Australia
Monarchy in Australia
1935 in New Zealand
Monarchy in New Zealand
Silver jubilees